Android TV is a smart TV operating system based on Android and developed by Google for television sets, digital media players, set-top boxes, and soundbars. A successor to Google TV, it features a user interface designed around content discovery and voice search, content aggregation from various media apps and services, and integration with other recent Google technologies such as Assistant, Cast, and Knowledge Graph.

The platform was first unveiled in June 2014, and was first made available on the Nexus Player that November. The platform has been adopted as smart TV middleware by companies such as Sony and Sharp, while Android TV products have also been adopted as set-top boxes by a number of IPTV television providers.

A special edition, called Android TV "Operator Tier", is provided to pay television and other service operators that implement Android TV on the device they provide to their subscribers to access media content. In this edition, the operator can customize the home screen and services on the device.

History 
Android TV was first announced at Google I/O in June 2014, as a successor to the commercially unsuccessful Google TV. The Verge characterized it as being more in line with other digital media player platforms, but leveraging Google's Knowledge Graph project; Chromecast compatibility; a larger emphasis on search; closer ties to the Android ecosystem (including Google Play Store and integration with other Android families such as Android Wear); and native support for video games, Bluetooth gamepads, and the Google Play Games framework. Some attendees received the platform's development kit, the ADT-1; The Information reported that the ADT-1 was based on a scrapped "Nexus TV" launch device that was being developed internally by Google. Google unveiled the first Android TV device, the Nexus Player developed by Asus, at a hardware event in October 2014.

The ADT-2 development kit device was released before the release of Android TV 9.0. Android TV 10 was released on December 10, 2019, together with the ADT-3 development kit. Android TV 11 was released for the ADT-3 on September 22, 2020, while rollouts were planned for original equipment manufacturer partners in subsequent months. Android TV 12 was released on November 30, 2021, with rollouts planned for late 2022. 

Android TV 13 was released on December 2, 2022 for developers using the ADT-3 development kit.

Features 
The Android TV platform is an adaptation of the Android OS for set-top boxes and as integrated software on smart TV hardware. Its home screen uses a vertically-scrolling, row-based interface, including a "content discovery" area populated by suggested content, followed by "Watch Now" rows that surface media content from installed apps. Android TV supports voice input for commands and universal search across multiple services using Google Assistant. With Google assistant, users can also control their Smart Home devices.

Subsequent releases of Android TV brought new features to the operating system, e.g. camera support (with Android TV 9), Auto low-latency mode for gaming (with Android TV 11), 4K UI, Refresh Rate switching & Text scaling (with Android TV 12) among others.

All Android TV devices support Google Cast, allowing media to be played on them from supported apps on other devices in an identical manner to Chromecast. Android TV supports software from the Play Store, including media apps and games (although not all Google Play apps are compatible with Android TV). Some Android TV devices, such as the Nvidia Shield and Razer Forge TV, are also marketed as microconsoles and bundled with a Bluetooth wireless gamepad.

Google TV interface 

A modified Android TV user interface, branded "Google TV" (unrelated to the company's discontinued smart TV platform of the same name), debuted on the Chromecast with Google TV streaming device, which was released on September 30, 2020, coinciding with the rebranding of the Google Play Movies & TV video-on-demand (VOD) service to Google TV on Android devices. The Google TV interface emphasizes on content recommendations and discovery across different services and installed apps, compared to the stock Android TV interface that is more focused on navigating between individual installed apps. Google TV is compatible with over 10,000 apps built for Android TV, up from the 6,500 available at launch.

, Google TV integrates with 50 streaming services for use in its content aggregation features in the United States:

 A&E
 ABC
 Amazon Prime Video
 AMC
 Apple TV+
 BET+
 Brown Sugar
 Comedy Central
 Crackle
 Crunchyroll
 Discovery+
 DisneyNOW
 Disney+
 FlixLatino
 Fox Now
 Freevee
 FuboTV
 Funimation
 Globoplay
 Hulu
 HBO Go
 HBO Max
 History
 iQIYI
 Kocowa
 Lifetime
 MGM+
 MTV
 NBC

 Pantaya
 Paramount+
 Peacock
 Philo
 Plex
 Pluto TV
 Red Bull TV
 Showtime
 Sling TV
 Starz
 TBS
 The CW
 TNT
 Tubi TV
 VH1
 Viki
 YouTube TV
 Zee5

The Google TV interface was intended to replace the stock Android TV interface by the end of 2022, starting with set-top boxes, dongles, and smart TVs in 2021. Thus far, the Android TV operating system has only received a redesign of its homescreen, called the "Discover" UI, a server-side update that began rolling out in February 2021.

Devices 

Android TV has been used to power many types of devices, like smart TVs, smart projectors, set-top boxes and dongles.

During Google I/O 2014, Google announced that Sony, Sharp, and TP Vision/Philips would release smart TVs with Android TV integrated in 2015. It was noted that support for handling TV-specific functions, such as input switching and tuning, were natively integrated into the Android platform.

Sony unveiled a range of Bravia smart TVs running Android TV at CES 2015. Sharp released two TV models on June 10, 2015. Philips announced that 80% of their 2015 TVs will run Android TV, the first two models of which were released in June 2015.

Google announced other television hardware partners in January 2016, including Arçelik, Bang & Olufsen, Hisense, RCA, TCL Corporation, Vestel, OnePlus and Realme.

Numerous commercial set-top boxes and dongles have been released using Android TV, most notably Google's Nexus Player, the Nvidia Shield TV, and Xiaomi's Mi Box, Mi Box S, and Mi TV Stick.

Google also released its own Chromecast with Google TV dongle, on September 30, 2020.

Also, several pay television providers have released IPTV services using Android TV-based hardware as opposed to a proprietary set-top box.

See also 
 List of smart TV platforms

References

External links 

 

2014 software
Android (operating system)
Google software
Smart TV